Victoria Dawn Justice (born February 19, 1993) is an American actress and singer. She has received several accolades, including two Young Artist Awards and nominations for three Imagen Awards, an NAACP Image Award, and three Kids' Choice Awards.

Justice made her acting debut with a guest appearance on the comedy drama series Gilmore Girls (2003), and rose to fame on Nickelodeon, playing Lola Martinez on the comedy drama series Zoey 101 (2005–2008), Tori Vega on the teen sitcom Victorious (2010–2013), and Jordan Sands in the television comedy horror film The Boy Who Cried Werewolf (2010). She subsequently appeared in the romantic comedy film The First Time (2012), the teen film Fun Size (2012), the comedy drama film Naomi and Ely's No Kiss List (2015), the teen comedy film The Outcasts (2017), the romance film Trust (2021), the comedy film Afterlife of the Party (2021), and the romantic comedy film A Perfect Pairing (2022), and also starred in the lead role of Lindy Sampson on the MTV thriller television series Eye Candy (2015). 

In music, Justice has recorded several songs for the soundtracks of her acting projects, including Victorious and the 2009 Nickelodeon musical Spectacular!. Her debut single "Gold" was released in 2013. She took a seven-year hiatus from music, making her comeback with the track "Treat Myself", released in December 2020.

Early life
Victoria Dawn Justice was born on February 19, 1993, in the Miami suburb of Hollywood, Florida, the daughter of Serene Reed and Zack Justice. Her father is of English, German, and Irish descent; while her mother, originally from the Bronx, is of Puerto Rican ancestry.

She has a younger half-sister named Madison Grace Reed. She and her family moved to Hollywood, Los Angeles, in 2003. While filming Victorious, Justice attended Cleveland High School before completing her diploma through a home school program.

Since 2013, Justice has lived with her parents in an Encino Hills home she purchased.

Career

2000s
In 2003, Justice began her acting career when she was 10 years old, making a guest appearance on the Gilmore Girls episode "The Hobbit, the Sofa and Digger Stiles". Justice portrayed Jill No. 2, a walk-on role. After her appearance in the series, her family moved to Los Angeles, when Justice began to pursue a career in acting. The following year, Justice guest-starred on the second episode of the Disney Channel series The Suite Life of Zack & Cody, in which she played a young pageant contestant named Rebecca. Later, Justice was cast as Stella, a young girl who begins seeing visions of Mary Magdalene, in Aaron Ruell's 2005 short film Mary.

In 2005, Justice was accepted into the musical theatre program at the Millikan Performing Arts Academy in Los Angeles. She appeared in advertisements for companies such as Ralph Lauren, Gap, Guess, Mervyn's, Peanut Butter Toast Crunch, and Ovaltine. During the same year, Justice landed a main role in the Nickelodeon series Zoey 101 as Lola Martinez, a new student who is an aspiring actress. On landing the role, she said, "I was extremely happy; I was bouncing up and down and screaming. That was a really great moment." Justice's character was introduced in the second season on September 11, 2005. She also made a cameo appearance in the R-rated film When Do We Eat?, and played the role of Rose in the Hallmark television film Silver Bells, the latter of which became a Hallmark Hall of Fame film. 

In 2006, Justice made a guest appearance on an episode of Everwood in the episode "Enjoy the Ride". Also in 2006, Justice played the supporting role of Holly in the thriller film The Garden. The film was met with negative reviews from critics. Zoey 101 ended its run on May 2, 2008. In 2009, she announced plans to guest star on an episode of Nickelodeon's series The Naked Brothers Band. The TV special, titled Valentine Dream Date, featured Justice portraying herself. Justice did not record new music until 2009, when she starred in the Nickelodeon musical Spectacular!, in which Justice performs three songs. The film aired on Nickelodeon on February 16, 2009. The film became one of Nickelodeon's most popular movies, attracting an audience 3.7million viewers on its premiere night. The film received generally positive reviews from several critics and held a 76 percent approval rating on Rotten Tomatoes as of 2011.

2010s
After the success of The Naked Brothers Band special in which Justice guest starred, she appeared in another episode, "The Premiere", on April 11, 2009. She later appeared in episodes of iCarly, True Jackson, VP, The Troop, and BrainSurge. Justice announced in 2009 that she would be working on a thriller film, set for theatrical release. Unlike initial plans of a theatrical release, the film had a limited preview release on December 12, 2009, and was returned to post production. Ultimately the film's worldwide release was canceled.

Justice confirmed that she would be starring in her own musical show on Nickelodeon called Victorious, explaining the show's genesis thus: "I was on Zoey 101. When I was 12, Dan Schneider cast me as a new character, Lola Martinez. From there, I worked with him for three years, on three seasons of Zoey 101. And, after that, Dan found out that I could also sing and dance as well as act, so he thought it would be really cool to create a show for me on Nickelodeon, called Victorious." The pilot for the show debuted on March 27, 2010, and received 5.7million views, making it the second-highest rated premiere for a live-action Nickelodeon series. The original broadcast of this episode took place following the 2010 Kids' Choice Awards. Justice recorded several songs for the series throughout its run. Justice had the opportunity to share a recording set during the series' recordings, with different young artists who, like her, were in search of artistic possibilities. 

Justice later guest-starred on the animated series The Penguins of Madagascar, voicing the character of Stacy in the episode "Badger Pride". Justice starred in the 2010 Nickelodeon television movie The Boy Who Cried Werewolf, playing Jordan Sands, a girl who is transformed into a werewolf following her move to a creepy manor. The film averaged 5.8million viewers for the premiere. Victorious ended its run on February 2, 2013. Justice played the lead role Wren in the comedy Fun Size, released on October 26, 2012. In a 2010 interview with the Associated Press, she stated that she was recording an album but planned to take her time with the process. In October 2012, she revealed she would release her debut album in 2013. For the Girl Up movement, which helps girls in developing countries, she released a promotional single, "Girl Up", co-written with Toby Gad, on February 16, 2013. Justice's debut single "Gold" was released on June 18, 2013. In August 2014, Billboard revealed that Justice had left Columbia Records but was recording new music to be released in 2015.

In October 2013, it was announced that Justice had been cast as Lindy Sampson in MTV's Eye Candy, a cyber thriller based on the novel by R. L. Stine. The series was canceled after one season. The same year, it was announced that Justice had been cast in Naomi and Ely's No Kiss List. The film had its world premiere at the Outfest Film Festival on July 17, 2015. It was later released on September 18, 2015, through video-on-demand services. Justice also competed against Gregg Sulkin in an episode of Lip Sync Battle that aired on July 30, 2015, performing Bonnie Tyler's "Total Eclipse of the Heart" and Nelly's "Hot in Herre".

On October 20, 2016, Justice played Janet Weiss, one of the lead roles in the Fox musical film The Rocky Horror Picture Show: Let's Do the Time Warp Again. It is a tribute to the cult classic 1975 film of the same name and was directed by Kenny Ortega, using the original script written by Richard O'Brien and Jim Sharman. Justice also starred in The Outcasts as Jodie. The film was released on April 14, 2017.

2020s 
Justice hosted the 2020 Kids' Choice Awards following Nickelodeon's decision to stage the event virtually. In July 2020, Justice announced she had become a member of the Recording Academy. That December, Justice announced that her first single in over seven years would be titled "Treat Myself". The song was released on December 11, 2020, and is the first single she released as an independent artist. This was followed by a single titled "Stay", released on February 12, 2021. The next single, "Too F*ckin' Nice", was released on May 28, 2021.

On March 12, 2021, Justice starred as Brooke Gatwick in the romantic drama film Trust. To promote the film, she released a cover of Billy Paul's "Everybody's Breaking Up". Justice starred as Cassie Garcia in the film Afterlife of the Party, which premiered on September 2, 2021, on Netflix. Along with Spencer Sutherland and Jessica Rose Weiss, she released the soundtrack EP to which she performed and co-wrote a song titled "Home". Justice portrayed Lola Alvarez in the Netflix romantic comedy film A Perfect Pairing, released on May 19, 2022. She also joined the cast of the comedy film California King and mystery thriller film The Tutor, playing a pregnant woman in the latter.

On February 19, 2023, coinciding with her 30th birthday, Justice released the single "Last Man Standing". She plans to release her debut studio album.

Philanthropy
Justice has taken part in several charity events, supporting charities such as the United Nations Foundation, which benefits numerous causes such as AIDS, Children, Environment, Health, Human Rights and Peace.

On September 30, 2010, Justice announced she would be joining the charity campaign Girl Up. When asked about joining, she stated "I'm so excited to become a champion for Girl Up and to help make a difference for girls who aren't given the same opportunities that most of us take for granted. I know that there are plenty of girls throughout the country who are just like me—ready and motivated to stand up for the rights and well-being of girls in the developing world. I am confident that, together, we will rise to the challenge." Justice joined Girl Up on September 30, 2010, for the campaign's official launch in New York City and went on to support the "Unite for Girls" tour, which traveled to cities across the United States. She visited Girl Up–supported programs in developing countries to observe first-hand the impact the programs can have on girls and communities. In an interview with Seventeen, Justice stated, "I was looking into different charities and hearing these girls in Guatemala and Africa talk about having to walk miles for water and crying because they don't have any money to go to school. It just really broke my heart, so I want to spread the word as much as I can and get other people working together. Before you know it we can actually make a difference."

Influences
Justice's musical influences include Madonna, Britney Spears, Pink, Sara Bareilles, Coldplay, No Doubt, the Jackson 5, the Beatles, Amy Winehouse, Lily Allen, Hall & Oates, Billy Joel, Carly Simon, Karen Carpenter, Elton John, Alanis Morissette, Carole King, and Diana Ross.

Filmography

Film

Television

Discography

Tours
 Make It in America Tour (2012)
 Summer Break Tour  (2013)

Awards and nominations

See also
 List of Puerto Ricans
 List of American former child actors

References

External links
 
 

 
1993 births
Living people
21st-century American actresses
21st-century American singers
21st-century American women singers
Actresses from Florida
American actresses of Puerto Rican descent
American child actresses
American child singers
American female dancers
American film actresses
American musicians of Puerto Rican descent
American people of English descent
American people of German descent
American people of Irish descent
American people of Puerto Rican descent
American philanthropists
American television actresses
American voice actresses
American women pop singers
Child pop musicians
Columbia Records artists
Hispanic and Latino American actresses
Hispanic and Latino American musicians
Hispanic and Latino American women singers
People from Hollywood, Florida
Singers from Florida